The Khoruongka (Xoruoŋka) is a river in the Sakha Republic (Yakutia), Russia. It is a left tributary of the Lena. The Khoruongka flows across Zhigansky District, not far to the west of Zhigansk town.

The basin of the Khoruongka falls fully within the Central Yakutian Lowland and parts of it are a protected area. The banks of the river are uninhabited.

Geography
The Khoruongka originates in Biedili, a small lake of the Central Yakutian Lowland. It flows first in a SSE direction within a swampy floodplain, then it bends eastwards. After a short stretch it bends again northeastwards, flowing finally almost northwards to the west of the course of the Lena to the north of the Nuora. The area where the Khoruongka flows is dotted with small lakes, especially to the west of its course. The Sobolokh-Mayan has its mouth approximately on the opposite side of the Lena.

See also
List of rivers of Russia

References

External links
Fishing & Tourism in Yakutia
Rivers of the Sakha Republic
Central Yakutian Lowland